Tarabya I (1297–1339) was king of Sagaing from 1327 to 1335/36. He succeeded King Saw Yun, his maternal half-brother. In 1335/36, he was brought put under arrest by his own son Shwetaungtet. The deposed king managed to have Shwetaungtet killed in 1339 but he himself was killed by Chief Minister Nanda Pakyan.

Brief
Tarabya was the only child of a commoner couple from Linyin in northern Burma. His mother may have been an ethnic Shan. His mother became a widow soon after his birth. She and her 1-year old were travelling south in 1298 when she met Thihathu, who was on a hunting trip. Thihathu, who had just founded the Myinsaing Kingdom with his two elder brothers, took her as a concubine. His mother was eventually raised to queen with the title of Yadanabon after his half-siblings Saw Yun and Saw Pale were born. Tarabya grew up at Thihathu's palace at Pinle, alongside his half-siblings as well as Uzana, biological son of King Kyawswa of Pagan, whom Thihathu had adopted as his own son. The family moved to Pinya in 1313 when Thihathu became the sole ruler of the Kingdom of Myinsaing–Pinya.

In 1315, Tarabya supported his half-brother Saw Yun's decision to revolt against Thihathu, and the brothers moved to Sagaing. In the following years, Tarabya became the deputy of Saw Yun, who managed to established himself as the de facto ruler of northern Upper Burma (present-day Sagaing Region and northern Mandalay Region). After Thihathu's death in 1325, Saw Yun officially broke away from Pinya and founded the Sagaing Kingdom.

The commoner became the ruler of Sagaing on 5 February 1327 after Saw Yun had died leaving four young children. Tarabya may claimed more than a regent status. (A contemporary inscription left by his mother says that Tarabya ascended the throne for he was the eldest [adopted] son of King Thihathu.) He raised Saw Yun's chief queen Saw Hnaung as his own chief queen. He did not harm any of Saw Yun's and Saw Hnaung's children who presumably had the rightful claim to the throne.

His reign lasted over eight years. In 1335/36, Tarabya was dethroned and imprisoned by his son Shwetaungtet, following a dispute between his son and his junior queens. For the next three plus years, the dowager queen Saw Hnaung plotted to overthrow her stepson. She continued to bribe the powerful minister Nanda Pakyan to keep her four children hidden at Mindon. Circa August 1339, Tarabya organized a coup and got Shwetaungtet killed. But as he prepared to reclaim the throne, Tarabya himself was killed by Nanda Pakyan, who feared Tarabya's punishment for the latter's collaboration with Shwetaungtet.

Chronicle reporting differences
Note that the chronicles do not agree on his birth and death dates, or reign dates.

Notes

References

Bibliography
 
 
 
 
 

Myinsaing dynasty
Sagaing dynasty
1339 deaths
1297 births
14th-century Burmese monarchs